Omorgus alius is a species of hide beetle in the subfamily Omorginae.

References

alius
Beetles described in 1986